The 1949 Turkish Football Championship was the 14th edition of the competition. It was held in June. Ankaragücü won their first and only national championship title by winning the Final Group in Ankara.

The champions of the three major regional leagues (Istanbul, Ankara, and İzmir) qualified directly for the Final Group. Eskişehir Demirspor qualified by winning the qualification play-off, which was contested by the winners of the regional qualification groups.

Qualification play-off

First round

Play-off final

Final group

References

External links
RSSSF

Turkish Football Championship seasons
Turkish
Turkey